Ulla Löfgren (born 1943) is a Swedish politician of the Moderate Party. She has been a member of the Riksdag from 1994 until 1998 and then again from 2002 until 2008.

External links 
Ulla Löfgren at the Riksdag website

Members of the Riksdag from the Moderate Party
Living people
1943 births
Women members of the Riksdag
Members of the Riksdag 2002–2006
21st-century Swedish women politicians